{{DISPLAYTITLE:C27H46O}}
The molecular formula C27H46O (molar mass: 386.65 g/mol, exact mass: 386.354866) may refer to:
 Cholestenol
 Allocholesterol (Δ-4-Cholestenol) CAS#
 Cholesterol (Δ-5-Cholestenol) CAS#
 Epicholesterol (3α-Cholesterol) CAS#
 Lathosterol (Δ-7-Cholestenol) CAS#
 Zymostenol (Δ-8-Cholestenol) CAS#
 Coprostanone CAS#
 i-cholesterol CAS#
 Dihydrotachysterol 3 CAS#